Alexander Wyatt Yarbrough (born August 3, 1991) is an American former minor league baseball player in the Miami Marlins organization.

College career
A three-year starter for the Ole Miss Rebels from 2010-2012, Yarbrough earned second-team All-Southeastern Conference honors as a sophomore, leading the Rebels in extra-base hits and multiple-hit games.

Yarbrough became one of the best infielders in college baseball as a junior, hitting .380 while committing only three errors all season. He earned first-team All-American honors. He was also a finalist for the Dick Howser Trophy and the Golden Spikes Award. Yarbrough also earned first-team All-SEC honors and was named the SEC all-defensive team. After the 2011 season, he played collegiate summer baseball with the Cotuit Kettleers of the Cape Cod Baseball League.

Professional career
Yarbrough was drafted by the Los Angeles Angels of Anaheim in the fourth round of the 2012 Major League Baseball Draft. After signing, Yarbrough spent most of the rest of the 2012 season with the Cedar Rapids Kernels before being promoted to the Arkansas Travelers. In 63 games between the two teams, he batted .275/.307/.393 with 27 RBIs. In 2013, he played for the Inland Empire 66ers where he slashed .313/.341/.459 with 11 home runs, 80 RBIs, 32 doubles, and ten triples in 136 games, and in 2014, he played with the Arkansas Travelers where he compiled a .285 batting average with five home runs, 77 RBIs, and 38 doubles in 136 games. Yarbrough spent 2015 with the Salt Lake Bees where he batted .236 with three home runs and 48 RBIs in 128 games, and 2016 with Salt Lake and Arkansas where he posted a combined .265 batting average with four home runs and 55 RBIs in 135 games between the two clubs.

At the 2016 Winter Meetings, the Miami Marlins selected Yarbrough from the Angels in the minor league phase of the Rule 5 draft. In 2017, he played for the Jacksonville Jumbo Shrimp where he batted .231 with four home runs and 30 RBIs in 111 games. He retired from professional baseball on February 14, 2018.

References

External links

1991 births
Living people
People from Allen, Texas
Baseball players from Texas
Baseball second basemen
Ole Miss Rebels baseball players
Cotuit Kettleers players
All-American college baseball players
Cedar Rapids Kernels players
Arkansas Travelers players
Inland Empire 66ers of San Bernardino players
Salt Lake Bees players
Jacksonville Jumbo Shrimp players